The Poznań–Piła railway is a Polish 92-kilometre long railway line, that connects Poznań with Piła.

Electrification
The line was electrified in 1990.

Route
The route is largely single track, with passing places at various stations along the route.

Modernisation
In October 2011, PKP PLK tendered for a feasibility study for the modernisation of the line. A tender for the modernisation was announced in October 2015. This investment is to be organised to be included in the budget of the European Union for the period 2014–2020.

Usage
The line is used by the following service(s):

Intercity services between Poznań and Piła, continuing to various parts of Poland, including Kołobrzeg, Słupsk, Wrocław, Katowice and Krakow.
Regional services between Poznań and Piła, with some of these continuing to Kołobrzeg or Koszalin.

See also 
 Railway lines of Poland

References

 This article is based upon a translation of the Polish language version as of October 2016.

External links 

Railway lines in Poland
Railway lines opened in 1879